Roy Allen born Edward Roy Allen (March 1859 – 26 October 1930) was a British tennis player active in the late 19th century and early 20th century. 

In major tournaments of the time he was an all-comers finalist in the men's doubles at the 1896 Wimbledon Championships partnering with his twin brother Charles Gladstone Allen where they lost to Reggie Doherty and Harold Nisbet. Roy played 28 consecutive seasons from 1887 to 1914, and won 97 singles titles.

Career
Roy played his first tournament 1887 at the Stevenage tournament where he reached the semi finals before losing to Arthur Gore. In 1891 he won his first title at the Boulogne, Boulogne-sur-Mer, France against Charles Gladstone Allen. In February 1913 he won his final title at the San Remo tournament in Italy. In 1914 he played his final tournament at the Monte Carlo Championships (today's Monte Carlo Masters) in France

Roy won numerous singles titles throughout his career,  he won the Durham County Association Tournament at Sunderland seven times (1900-01, 1906-10), Nottinghamshire Championships five times (1896, 1899, 1900, 1904-04), the Sheffield and Hallamshire Championships five times, the East of England Championships at Felixstowe five times (1891, 1893, 1895, 1903-04), the Warwickshire Championships at Leamington Spa five times (1896, 1898-99, 1905, 1910). 

He also won the Boulogne Tournament four times (1891, 1895, 1896-97), the 1910 - East Grinstead Open four times (1906, 1908-1910). The following tournaments he won three times, the Hampshire County Lawn Tennis Championship (1907-1909), the Lowestoft Tournament (1907-08, 1910), the Shropshire Championships at Shrewsbury (1905, 1907-08), the Norwich Open (1907-08, 1910), the Burton-on-Trent Open (1893, 1896, 1905), the Leicestershire Championships (1900-01, 1905), the Suffolk Championships at Saxmundham (1895-96, 1903) and the Colchester Championship (1893-95). 

The following tournaments he won at least two times including San Remo (1912-13), the Riviera Championships at Menton (1903, 1912), the Exmouth Open (1898, 1910), the Château-d'Œx tournament (1907-08), Nice (1902, 1906), Chichester Open (1896, 1905), the East Grinstead Open (1904, 1909), Sittingbourne (1901, 1903), the Mid-Kent Championships (1900, 1904), the Yorkshire Championships (1894, 1905), Bradford (1893, 1896) and Bournemouth Open Tournament (1904-05). 

In addition he won a single title at each of the following events, Newcastle Open (1894), West of England Championships (1895), Fitzwilliam Plate (1896), Kirkcaldy (1899), Essex Championships (1900), Frinton-on-Sea (1905), South Northumberland Tournament (1905), Cranbrook (1905), Warwick (1906), the French Switzerland Championships (1907), Worcestershire Championships (1908), Worthing (1908), Derbyshire Championships (1909) at Buxton, Southampton (1909), Skegness (1909), Great Yarmouth (1910) and the Dorset County Championships (1910).

He currently holds the all time record for most titles won on grass courts at 82.

Personal
Roy was born in 1868 Saint Neots, Bedfordshire, England. He was one of the twin sons of Rev. Hunter Bird Allen, the Rector of Colmworth Parish, and Adelaide Mary Gladstone. His twin brother was the other notable tennis player Charles Gladstone Allen. It was Hunter Bird who taught Charles and Roy how to play tennis which proved very successful for both of them. He died on 4 November 1931.

References

External links
 ATP Profile: E. Roy Allen.
 Wimbledon Player Profile: Roy Allen.

1868 births
1931 deaths
19th-century male tennis players
English male tennis players
British male tennis players